The Treaty of Teschen (i.e., "Peace of Teschen") was signed on 13 May 1779 in Teschen, then in Austrian Silesia, between the Austrian Habsburg monarchy and the Kingdom of Prussia, which officially ended the War of the Bavarian Succession.

Background
When the childless Wittelsbach elector Maximilian III Joseph of Bavaria died in 1777, the Habsburg emperor Joseph II sought to acquire most of the Electorate of Bavaria and the Upper Palatinate, basing his claim on his marriage with the late elector's sister, Maria Josepha, who had died in 1767. 

Maximilian's direct heir was his distant cousin Count Palatine and Prince-Elector Charles Theodore (1724–1799), by prior succession agreements between the Bavarian and Palatinate branches of the Wittelsbach dynasty. Charles Theodore was amenable to an agreement with Emperor Joseph II that would allow him to acquire parts of the Austrian Netherlands in exchange for parts of his Bavarian inheritance. From 16 January 1778 Austrian troops moved into the Lower Bavarian lands of Straubing. Ultimately, both parties envisioned a wholesale exchange of the Bavarian lands for the Austrian Netherlands, but the final details were never concluded by treaty due to outside intervention. 

Charles Theodore too had no legitimate heirs, so his prospective successor was his Palatine cousin, Duke Charles II August of Zweibrücken (1746–1795). Charles August objected to an agreement which would deprive him of the Bavarian inheritance; he appealed to the Imperial Diet in Regensburg. His cause was taken up by the Prussian king Frederick the Great, who refused any increase in Austrian territory, and by Saxony, whose  Wettin electoral house had married into the Wittelsbach family and therefore had allodial claims to parts of the inheritance. 

The War of the Bavarian Succession broke out with the invasion of the Prussian Army into  Bohemia on 5 July 1778, after Austria and Prussia could not negotiate a solution to their differences. Due to difficulties in supplying the troops, the war became a stalemate: the Prussians were not able to advance far into the Bohemian lands, but the Austrians were unwilling to invade Saxony or Prussia. This was partly because Empress Maria Theresa (the mother of Joseph II and his co-ruler as Queen of Bohemia and Archduchess of Austria) firmly opposed the war after it became clear that a stalemate prevailed. She dispatched peace initiatives to King Frederick II of Prussia and forced her son to accept mediation by  France and  Russia. The peace came at the initiative of the Russian Empress Catherine the Great and was guaranteed by both Russia and France.

Treaty

The accord dictated that the Habsburg Archduchy of Austria (Principality of Austria above the Enns) would receive the Bavarian lands east of the Inn river in compensation, a region then called "Innviertel", stretching from the Prince-Bishopric of Passau to the northern border of the Archbishopric of Salzburg. However, one of the requirements was that Austria would recognize the Prussian claims to the Franconian margraviates of Ansbach and Bayreuth, ruled in personal union by Margrave Christian Alexander from the House of Hohenzollern. Prussia finally purchased both margraviates in 1791. The Electorate of Saxony received a sum of six million guilders (florins) from Bavaria in exchange of its inheritance claims. 

With the accession of Elector Charles Theodore, the electorates of Bavaria and the County Palatine of the Rhine (i.e. the territories in the Rhenish Palatinate and the Upper Palatinate) were under the united rule of the House of Wittelsbach. Their electoral votes were combined into one per a provision in the earlier Treaty of Westphalia in 1648, thereby reducing the number of electorates in the Holy Roman Empire to eight. The Innviertel, except for a short time during the Napoleonic Wars, has remained with Upper Austria up to today.

Aftermath
In 1785, Maria Theresa's son and successor Emperor Joseph II of Austria made another try at attaching the Bavarian lands to his Habsburg possessions, and even contracted with Elector Charles Theodore to swap it for the Austrian Netherlands. However, Joseph II again did not agree to a full exchange of all provinces within the Austrian Netherlands and the agreement collapsed amidst tacit French opposition and overt Prussian hostility, with King Frederick II of Prussia raising the opposition by the Fürstenbund, an association of several Imperial princes. After the War of the Austrian Succession, Austria and Prussia had a long-standing rivalry for supremacy in Central Europe until 1866, termed Deutscher Dualismus (German dualism) in the German language area.

See also
 German dualism
 List of treaties

Footnotes

References
 Text of the Treaty at the website of the Mainz Institute of European History

Teschen
Teschen
History of Silesia
1770s in the Holy Roman Empire
18th century in Bavaria
18th century in Saxony
Cieszyn Silesia
1779 in the Habsburg monarchy
1779 treaties
Treaties of the Habsburg monarchy
Treaties of the Kingdom of Prussia
1779 in Prussia
Habsburg monarchy–Prussia relations
Holy Roman Empire–Russia relations